A number of auto dealership, auto service, and auto repair shop buildings are notable.  A number of these are listed on historic registers, including some in the United States whose notability is documented by their listing the National Register of Historic Places (NRHP).  Many auto dealership showroom buildings also include auto servicing areas.  This list is intended to include all notable showroom buildings, with or without associated auto service or auto repair facilities, and to include independent auto service or repair facilities.

Buildings which are primarily filling stations and only secondarily include an auto service bay are covered in List of historic filling stations, instead. as  These include places known as "service stations" in the U.S.

Malta

Turkey
One of the biggest collections of showrooms of any kind is a  car showroom complex in Istanbul called Autopia Europia.

United Arab Emirates
One of the world's largest showrooms of any kind is the  BMW showroom in Abu Dhabi. Another notable showroom in UAE is designed by Uruguayan architect Carlos Ott. Lamborghini unveiled its largest showroom in the world, a 30,000 sq. ft facility in Dubai.

United States

Numerous more auto showroom buildings are listed on the National Register as contributing buildings in historic districts, including some within Chicago's Motor Row District.

Under construction/To be added:
more items from "wt:NRHP#Gas station drive"
perhaps a few from List of historic filling stations

See also
List of historic filling stations, including some with service bays / garages / repair shops, and many known as "service stations".

References